The Kazakhstan Women's Volleyball League is an annual competition for women's volleyball clubs in Kazakhstan . It has been held since the 1992/93 season.

Competitions are held in three divisions : the National League and the major leagues "A" and "B".

History 
8 teams took part in the National League 2020/21: Altai (Ust-Kamenogorsk), Zhetysu (Taldykorgan), Kuanysh (Petropavlovsk), Almaty, Karaganda, Irtysh-Kazkhrom (Pavlodar), "Altai" -2 (Ust-Kamenogorsk), "Aru-Astana" (Nur-Sultan). The title was won by Altai, who won the final series beating Zhetysu 2-0 (3: 2, 3: 1). 3rd place was taken by "Kuanysh".

List of Champions

References

External links 
 Федерация волейбола Республики Казахстан 
 Kazakh League. women.volleybox.net 

Kazakhstan
Volleyball in Kazakhstan
Kazakh Women's League
Sports leagues established in 1992
1992 establishments in Kazakhstan
Sports leagues in Kazakhstan